Jalan Terus is "best of" album from Sheila on 7, released in 2005. It features three new songs: "Bertahan Disana", "Sekali Lagi", and "Jalan Terus".

Track listing 
 Bertahan Di Sana
 Sekali Lagi
 Kita
 Dan
 Sahabat Sejati
 Itu Aku
 Melompat Lebih Tinggi
 Pejantan Tangguh
 Pria Kesepian
 J.A.P
 Sephia
 Seberapa Pantas
 Berhenti Berharap
 Jalan Terus

References

2005 compilation albums
Sheila on 7 albums